Vergil Ortiz Jr. (born March 25, 1998) is an American professional boxer who has held the WBO International welterweight title since 2021. As an amateur, he was a seven-time national champion and was the winner at the 2013 Junior Olympics. He was named 2019 The Ring magazine Prospect of the Year. Ortiz is known for his punching power, with a knockout-to-win percentage of 100%. As of August 2022, Ortiz Jr is ranked as the world's fifth best welterweight by The Ring and fourth best by BoxRec and TBRB.

Professional career

Early career 
Ortiz was victorious in his first six fights, winning all six by stoppage and only going past the first round in one of the six fights.

Ortiz Jr vs. Valenzuela 
His seventh bout came on September 16, 2017 on the undercard of Canelo Álvarez vs. Gennady Golovkin I against Cesar Valenzuela, which he won by second-round technical knockout.

Ortiz Jr vs. Ortiz 
After improving to 11-0, Ortiz appeared a year later on the undercard of Canelo Álvarez vs. Gennady Golovkin II to face Roberto Ortiz. Vergil Ortiz knocked down his opponent with a right hand early in the second round. Roberto got up, but he was still hurt. Vergil attacked him immediately and knocked him down again with a right hand that sent his opponent to one knee. Roberto Ortiz reached his feet again, but the referee deemed him unfit to continue, calling off the fight.

Rise up the ranks

Ortiz Jr vs. Orozco 
Ortiz, who now had an unblemished record of 13-0, defeated Antonio Orozco by sixth-round technical knockout to win the vacant WBA Gold welterweight title on August 10, 2019 at The Theatre at Grand Prairie, Texas. He defended the title in his next fight against Brad Solomon on December 13, 2019 in Indio, California, winning by fifth-round knockout.

Ortiz Jr vs. Vargas 
Ortiz was originally scheduled to face Samuel Vargas on March 28, 2020 at The Forum, Inglewood, California on the undercard of Canelo Álvarez vs. Billy Joe Saunders. However, following the postponement of the fight between Álvarez and Saunders due to the COVID-19 pandemic, the fight took place on July 24, 2020 at the same venue as Ortiz's previous fight against Brad Solomon. Ortiz won the fight by seventh-round technical knockout and retained his WBA Gold welterweight title.

Ortiz Jr vs. Hooker 
Ortiz returned to the ring on March 20, 2021, beating Maurice Hooker with another seventh-round technical knockout in Fort Worth, Texas to win the vacant WBO International welterweight title. Hooker was ranked #8 by the WBO, #13 by the WBC and #15 by the IBF at welterweight.

Ortiz Jr vs. Kavaliauskas 
On August 14, 2021, Ortiz defended the title against Egidijus Kavaliauskas. Kavaliauskas was ranked #5 by the WBO and #10 by the WBC at welterweight. Kavaliauskas, who became Ortiz's first opponent to last longer than seven rounds, suffered five knockdowns as Ortiz won by eighth-round technical knockout.

Ortiz Jr vs. McKinson 
On August 6, 2022, Ortiz Jr fought Michael McKinson in an eliminator for the WBA world welterweight title. McKinson was ranked #5 by the WBO and #10 by the WBA at welterweight. Ortiz Jr beat McKinson by technical knockout in the 9th round.

Professional boxing record

References

Boxers from Texas
Welterweight boxers
1998 births
Living people

External links

Vergil Ortiz Jr - Profile, News Archive & Current Rankings at Box.Live